La Belle Alliance is an inn situated a few miles south of Brussels in Belgium, chiefly remembered for its significance in the aftermath of the Battle of Waterloo (18 June 1815).

There are two plaques on the building: one is "In memory of the French Medical Corps who attended the wounded with devotion on 18 June 1815"; and the other commemorates the meeting of the two victorious field marshals at the end of the Battle of Waterloo.

Contemporary use 
The building is currently used on Friday and Saturday evenings as a night club.

Battle of Waterloo

After the Battle of Waterloo, at around 21:00, Prince Blücher and the Duke of Wellington met close to the inn signifying the end of the fighting. There is a large mural within the Palace of Westminster painted by Daniel Maclise in 1861 that depicts the meeting taking place at La Belle Alliance.
According to page 57 of his 1877 Book "Notes and Reminiscences of a Staff Officer " by Lieutenant Colonel Basil Jackson ,writes: Certainly it was a moment when even the Iron Duke might feel excited. I heard him say to Colborne ( who had stopped the 52nd and was forming his troops for the Duke to review ) , as he shook hands on departing, that he would endeavour to send some flour for his men. He then turned his horse towards Waterloo, followed by five persons only.
On nearing the farm of La Belle Alliance, a group of horsemen were seen crossing the fields on our right ; on seeing them, the Duke left the road to meet them. They proved to be Marshal Blucher and his suite. The two great chiefs cordially shook hands, and were together about ten minutes ; it was then so dark that I could not distinguish Blucher's features, and had to ask a Prussian officer whom the Duke was conversing with, although I was quite close to him at the time, but of course not near enough to hear what was said. On leaving Blucher, the Duke rode at a walk towards Waterloo. Darkness shrouded the spectacle of the dead and dying near La Haye Sainte ; but the frequent snorting of our horses as they trod between them showed that the ground, so fiercely contested during the day, was very thickly strewed with bodies of the brave.

Blücher, the Prussian commander, suggested that the battle be remembered as la Belle Alliance, to commemorate the European Seventh Coalition of Britain, Russia, Prussia, the Netherlands, Sweden, Austria, Spain, Portugal, Sardinia, and a number of German States which had all joined the coalition to defeat the French Emperor.  Wellington, who had chosen the field and commanded an allied army which had fought the French all day, instead recommended Waterloo, the village just north of the battlefield, where he himself had spent the previous night. Nevertheless, in 1815 the Rondell  plaza in Berlin was renamed Belle-Alliance-Platz to commemorate the victory. There is a single La Belle Alliance Square in the UK, in Ramsgate, Kent.

Name
According to J.B. Romberg who published an account of the locations around Brussels in 1820, originally La Belle Alliance consisted of three houses, one of which was a tavern, that now bears the name, and two adjacent houses. Some time before the Battle of Waterloo, the publican of the tavern died, and his widow married the occupier of Trimotion, the farm-house opposite; but losing him in a short time afterwards, she consoled herself by taking for her third husband a peasant who lived a house close by (now known as Decoster's house); but here again death interrupted her happiness, when she once more embraced the married state it was to marry the new landlord tavern; from which time it obtained the title it now bears.

See also
List of Waterloo Battlefield locations

Notes

References

External links

 — historical images of La Belle Alliance

Buildings and structures in Walloon Brabant
Waterloo Battlefield locations